is an ōdachi (Japanese huge greatsword) forged by the swordsmith  and an Important Cultural Property of Japan.

History 
The name came from a legend that one night flaws on the blade were repaired by fireflies. The  is also known as  since it was kept as a treasure of the Aso Shrine.

The  was designated an Important Cultural Property of Japan (then-National Treasure) on December 14, 1931. Since the end of World War II, however, it has been missing. 

In 2015, Touken Ranbu fans raised  through crowdfunding to construct a replica of the Hotarumaru. During the reconstruction, the Aso Shrine was destroyed from an earthquake in April 2016. A ceremony for the completion of the replica was held on August 27, 2016, and it is now displayed at the Aso Shrine.

References

Bibliography

Individual_Japanese_swords
Important Cultural Properties of Japan
Aso shrines